Chief Petty Officer Ernest Herbert Pitcher  (31 December 1888 − 10 February 1946) (middle name also recorded as James) was a Royal Navy (RN) sailor and an English recipient of the Victoria Cross (VC), the highest award for gallantry in the face of the enemy that can be awarded to British and Commonwealth forces.

Naval career
During the First World War Pitcher served in Q ships commanded by Commander Gordon Campbell. The first was HMS Farnborough (Q.5) which sank two U-boats but was herself sunk by the second; Captain Campbell was awarded the VC after the second action. Most of the crew, including Pitcher, were rescued and followed Campbell to HMS Pargust.

Pargust sank the U-boat UC-29 but was herself severely damaged. The Admiralty decided that Pargust'''s action was worthy of the VC but that all of the crew had acted with equal valour, so article 13 of the VC's royal warrant was applied and the ship's company voted for one commissioned officer and one petty officer or seaman to receive the award: these were Pargust first lieutenant, Ronald Stuart, and seaman William Williams. Pitcher received the Distinguished Service Medal. Campbell and the crew then transferred to HMS Dunraven, in which the action took place for which Pitcher was awarded the VC.

Petty Officer Pitcher was captain of the 4-inch gun crew. When the magazine below them blew up the crew were blown into the air, but Pitcher and another man landed on mock railway trucks made of wood and canvas, which cushioned their falls and saved their lives. His VC was awarded by ballot of the gun crew. Lieutenant Charles George Bonner was also awarded the VC. Pitcher also received the Croix de Guerre and the Médaille Militaire.

Interbellum and later life
In 1920 Pitcher was promoted to chief petty officer. In 1927 he retired from the Royal Navy and lived in Dorset, where he taught woodwork in a boys' school in Swanage and also ran a pub, the "Royal Oak" in Herston. On the outbreak of the Second World War he rejoined the Navy and served onshore in the south of England. After the war his health deteriorated and he died of tuberculosis on 10 February 1946. His body was brought back to Swanage, where he is buried in Northbrook Cemetery.

References

Notes

Bibliography

Monuments to Courage (David Harvey, 1999)
The Register of the Victoria Cross (This England, 1997)
VCs of the First World War - The Naval VCs (Stephen Snelling, 2002)

External links

Location of grave and VC medal (Dorset)''

1888 births
1946 deaths
Military personnel from Cornwall
Burials in Dorset
People from Cornwall
Royal Navy sailors
British World War I recipients of the Victoria Cross
Recipients of the Distinguished Service Medal (United Kingdom)
Royal Navy recipients of the Victoria Cross
Royal Navy personnel of World War I
Royal Navy personnel of World War II
Recipients of the Croix de Guerre 1914–1918 (France)
20th-century deaths from tuberculosis
Tuberculosis deaths in England